Ozerische - the place-name:

Localities

Belarus
 Ozerische - a village in the Chechersk district of Gomel region.
 Ozerische - a village in Osipovichi district of Mogilev region.
 Ozerische - village, which is part of Minsk

Russia
 Ozerische - a village in Zhukovsky district of the Bryansk region.
 Ozerische - a village in the Bryansk region Zlynkovsky District.
 Ozerische - in the village of Pochep area of the Bryansk region.
 Ozerische - in the village of Starodubsky area of the Bryansk region.
 Ozerische - a village in Dorogobuzh district of Smolensk region.
 Ozerische - a village in the Smolensk region Smolensk region.

Ukraine
 Ozeryshche - а village in Cherkasy Raion of Cherkasy Oblast.

Other
 Ozerische - railway station in Minsk.

See also
 Ozerischenskoe rural settlement
 Ozeritsy
 Ponds
 Ozerschina